El dios queja is the second EP by the Japanese doom metal band Corrupted, released in 1995.

Track listing

Side one

Side two

Corrupted (band) EPs
1995 EPs